The following is a list of ecoregions in Malawi, as identified by the Worldwide Fund for Nature (WWF).

Terrestrial ecoregions
by major habitat type

Tropical and subtropical moist broadleaf forests

 Southern Zanzibar-Inhambane coastal forest mosaic

Tropical and subtropical grasslands, savannas, and shrublands

 Central Zambezian miombo woodlands
 Eastern miombo woodlands
 Southern miombo woodlands
 Zambezian and mopane woodlands

Montane grasslands and shrublands

 South Malawi montane forest-grassland mosaic
 Southern Rift montane forest-grassland mosaic

Flooded grasslands and savannas

 Zambezian flooded grasslands

Freshwater ecoregions
by bioregion

Great Lakes

 Lake Malawi

Eastern and Coastal

 Lakes Chilwa and Chiuta

Zambezi

 Zambezi
 Mulanje
 Lower Zambezi

References
 Burgess, Neil, Jennifer D’Amico Hales, Emma Underwood (2004). Terrestrial Ecoregions of Africa and Madagascar: A Conservation Assessment. Island Press, Washington DC.
 Thieme, Michelle L. (2005). Freshwater Ecoregions of Africa and Madagascar: A Conservation Assessment. Island Press, Washington DC.

 
Malawi
Ecoregions